Sulgen railway station is a railway station in Sulgen, in the Swiss canton of Thurgau. It is an intermediate stop on the Winterthur–Romanshorn line and the northern terminus of the Sulgen–Gossau line.

Services 
Sulgen is served by the S5 and S10 of the St. Gallen S-Bahn:

 St. Gallen S-Bahn:
 : half-hourly service between Wil and Romanshorn.
 Zürich S-Bahn:
 : peak-hour service between Zürich main station and  via .

References

External links 
 
 

Railway stations in the canton of Thurgau
Swiss Federal Railways stations